Tsewang Lhamo (died 1812) was the Queen of the Kingdom of Derge for eight years. During her reign, she fostered the development of printing and publishing. Her life was documented by Getse Mahapandita, who served as her chaplain.

References 

Tibetan women
People from Kham
18th-century Tibetan people
19th-century Tibetan people
1812 deaths
Year of birth missing